Tunde Adeniran (born 29 September 1945) is a Nigerian scholar, politician, diplomat, and former minister of education. A former staff of United Nations, Tunde - before moving into politics in 1998 - retired as a political science lecturer at the University of Ibadan after many years of lecturing in Nigeria and America. He is an author of a number of books and journal articles.

Education
Tunde is a graduate of University of Ibadan, Nigeria and Columbia University, USA.

Political career
From 2004 to 2007, Tunde served Nigeria as its ambassador to Germany.
 From October to December 1985, Tunde Adeniran was a member of Nigerian Delegation to the 40th Session of the United Nations. He was the director at Directorate for Social Mobilization (MAMSER) between 1987 and 1992. From January to August 1993, Tunde served as the Chairman of the Directorate for Social Mobilization (MAMSER). He was a member of the Committee on Nigerian National Defence Policy for the year 2000. He was a member of the Advisory Committee on Foreign Affairs from 1983 to 1985. Tunde Adeniran, was also a member of the Political Bureau from January 1986 to March 1987. Prior to that, he was a member of the Ondo State Economic Advisory Council from 1980 to 1983. In 1982, Tunde Adeniran was a member of Ondo State Local Government Review and Reorganization Committee (Justice Akintan Panel).
At party level, Tunde Adeniran was a member of the Board of Trustees (BoT) of the Peoples Democratic Party (PDP) before his defection to Social Democratic Party in 2018.

Achievement
During his time as the Head of Nigerian mission to Germany, Tunde Adeniran improved the image of Nigeria considerably before the host country. He restored German investors' confidence in Nigerian economy fairly. Tunde established exchange programmes meant to deepen collaboration between Nigerian and German institutions in the areas of health, environment and education. As education minister, Tunde Adeniran introduced a number of reforms to aid development of Nigerian education sector.

Award and Honour
Tunde has received a number of awards and honours. He was awarded American Medal of Honour in 2001. He became a fellow of Nigerian National Institute for Educational Planning and Administration (NIEPA) in 2002. In 1998, he received Ambassador of Peace/Gold Medal Award for Leadership. He was the sole recipient of Ekiti Parapo Merit Award in 1996. In 2002, Tunde was made a Fellow of the Federal Polytechnic, Offa, Nigeria (FFPO).

Non-Profit and Community Service
Tunde Adeniran is a church leader and a knight of John Wesley. He is involved in a number of charity works and community service.

Advocacy
Tunde thinks that "unless Nigeria makes education free and compulsory up to the secondary school level, and insist on proper training of teachers and quality education for Nigerians", the country would not be able to effectively use technological innovations to ease governance and economic activities including electronic voting. Tunde called for reforms in Organisation of African Unity that will provide strategies that meet the challenges of conflicts and disputes in African nations. According to Tunde, "African  disputes  need  a peace-making  and  peace-keeping  machinery for  their  resolution". On Monday 23, April 2018, Tunde Adeniran and other SDP leaders called on “all patriotic Nigerians who believe in national unity, justice, equity and progress to come together and rescue the nation.” On Nigeria's image, Tunde thinks every Nigerian has a responsibility to represent the country well in every aspect and every area of life. "We need to continue the promotion of good image through our activities at home and abroad and the correct and credible interpretation of developments" in Nigeria, remarked Tunde Adeniran. On the economy, Tunde Adeniran thinks Nigeria needs to remain consistent in her economic policies in order to experience significant results. "Through my investment drive, I have realized that we need to remain consistent in our economic policies", he stated. He calls for synergy between various government agencies, ministries and missions involved in investment drive. The professor of political science, thinks Nigeria's Local Government System, rather than be an instrument of development, is the most tragic aspect of the country's current democratic system as it is currently not run as it should be.

References 

Living people
1945 births
People from Ekiti State
Academic staff of the University of Ibadan

University of Ibadan alumni